Anthoni is a Swedish, Danish, Finnish and Norwegian form of Antoni that is used in Finland, Denmark, Sweden, Norway, Republic of Karelia, Estonia and Greenland. It is a given name and surname. Notable people with the name include the following:

Given first name
Anthoni van Noordt (c. 1619 – 1675), Dutch composer
Anthoni Schoonjans (1655 – 1726), Flemish painter

Middle name
Charles Brooke, Rajah of Sarawak,  (born Charles Anthoni Johnson Brooke; 1829 – 1917),  Sarawak royalty

Surname
Arno Anthoni (1900 – 1961), Finnish lawyer and holocaust perpetrator
Anna Berentine Anthoni (1884 – 1951), Norwegian trade unionist and politician

See also

Anthon (given name)
Anthon (surname)
Anthonie
Anthonij
Anthonis
Anthonio (disambiguation)
Anthony (given name)
Anthony (surname)
Antoni

Notes

Danish masculine given names
Finnish masculine given names
Norwegian masculine given names
Swedish masculine given names